Bhoomika Shetty is an Indian actress known for her role in the Kannada-language television series Kinnari. and Telugu series Ninne Pelladatha. She was a contestant in the reality television show Bigg Boss Kannada and made it the finals. Shetty made her film debut with the 2021 Kannada film, Ikkat.

Early life and family
Bhoomi Shetty hails from Kundapura, located in West coast Karavali region of Karnataka. She was born to Bhaskar and Baby Shetty in Kundapura, Karanataka. She speaks fluent Kannada and Telugu. Bhoomi Shetty has learnt Yakshagana during her school days.

Acting career
Shetty made her acting debut in the television series Kinnari. She played the lead character, Mani. She also played the main role of Mrudula in Telugu serial Ninne Pelladatha. In 2019, she appeared as a contestant in the seventh season of the reality TV show, Bigg Boss Kannada. In 2021, she briefly starred in Telugu TV series Akka Chellelu and then made her film debut with Kannada film, Ikkat premiered on Amazon Prime Video.

Awards, honours and recognitions 
Bhoomi Shetty won the Hyderabad Times, Most desirable woman of small screen for the year 2018.

References

Year of birth missing (living people)
Actresses from Bangalore
People from Udupi district
Kannada actresses
Indian film actresses
Actresses in Kannada cinema
21st-century Indian actresses
Indian television actresses
Actresses in Telugu television
Actresses in Kannada television
Living people